Michelle Alejandra Gómez Bustos (born July 17, 1992) is a Colombian model and beauty pageant titleholder who was crowned as Miss Earth Colombia 2015 and represented Colombia at Miss Earth 2016. She also made history for Colombia as the first Colombian elemental queen after receiving the Miss Earth - Air 2016 title.

Biography

Early life and career beginnings
As published in Miss Earth's official website, Michelle described her childhood days as, "I was one of the best students in my school, my favorites subjects were science, and Spanish. I loved to play in the park near to my house with my cousins and friends, we used to plant flowers and pick up flowers to decorate our houses, we were like the guardians of the park, and I also loved to dress up like a model and imagine that I was a super model." She learned that, "I learned to love nature with my friends; we were so worried about the plants and animals. And I also to respect every living thing on earth."

Pageantry

Miss Earth Colombia 2016
Michelle Gómez represented her hometown, Sumapaz, at the Miss Earth Colombia 2016 pageant. At the end of the pageant, Michelle was hailed as Miss Earth Colombia 2016 and was crowned by Miss Earth 2015 Angelia Ong.

Miss Earth 2016
Michelle flew to the Philippines to compete at the Miss Earth 2016 pageant where she competed with 82 other candidates. In the entire pre-pageant activities of Miss Earth pageant, Michelle was able to get a bronze medal for the swimsuit competition and several sponsor awards. 

As a Miss Earth delegate, the representative should have an environmental advocacy that serves as her focus as part of the pageant's environmental awareness. When Michelle was asked what her advocacy is all about, she answered, "I would like to work on changing minds and transforming hearts, to be more aware of what’s happening in the world right now. If we transform our way to see the world and change our habits little by little we will increase our planet’s chance of surviving the contamination produce by us. As Miss Earth I would like to work with every person that I know as a family, a lot of people is better than just one so we can make the message get to more places. Also as Miss Earth Colombia will continue helping Miss Earth 2015 project with the recycling of used tires because I have seeing the positive impact this campaign has create in restoring abandoned parks that now are used by young kids as playgrounds."

At the end of the pageant, Michelle finished as Miss Earth - Air 2016. The Miss Earth crown was won by Katherine Espín of Ecuador.

References

External links
Miss Earth Official Website
Miss Earth Colombia 2016 Eco-Beauty Video
Michelle Gómez  at Miss Earth Official Website

1992 births
Living people
Colombian female models
Colombian beauty pageant winners
People from Bogotá
Miss Earth 2016 contestants